Arjunn Dutta  is an Indian film director and screenwriter who predominantly works in Bengali cinema. His first feature film Abyakto (2018) was a critical success and earned laurels in film festivals.

Early life
Dutta was born in Kolkata in West Bengal.

Career
Dutta made a short The 6th Element in 2016, which received positive critical reviews. His first feature film Abyakto (2018) was a critical success and earned laurels in film festivals. His second feature film Guldasta was released on 21 October 2020, to lukewarm reviews.

Filmography

As director

References

External links

Living people
1986 births
University of Calcutta alumni
Bengali film directors
21st-century Indian film directors
Bengali screenwriters
Screenwriters from Kolkata
Film directors from Kolkata